The Houston Astros are a professional baseball team based in Houston, Texas. They compete in the Western Division of Major League Baseball's (MLB) American League (AL). The Astros began play during the 1962 MLB season as an expansion team and were known as the Houston Colt .45s for their first three years of existence. They played in the National League prior to 2013. The team's list of records includes individual single-season records set by Astros players for both batting and pitching.

Individual batting leaders

Individual pitching leaders

See also

 Baseball statistics
 List of Major League Baseball career records
 List of Major League Baseball records considered unbreakable
 List of Major League Baseball single-game records
 List of Major League Baseball single-season records

References
Footnotes

Sources

External links
All-time leaders & stats. Houston Astros official website

Records
Major League Baseball team records